WMRF-FM (95.7 FM) is a hot adult contemporary radio station from Lewistown, Pennsylvania branded as "Merf Radio". The station serves communities throughout Mifflin County, Juniata County, and western Snyder County all in central Pennsylvania. The station is owned by Seven Mountains Media, through licensee Southern Belle, LLC.

The broadcasts come from WMRF from their studios in downtown Lewistown.

In late 2015, WLAK-FM no longer simulcasted WMRF, and instead became Hunny 103.5, broadcasting a classic hits format. Hunny was formerly broadcasting at 106.3. The move also decreased the listening area, since WHUN broadcasts from Huntingdon.

On-air personalities
 Rocco Pallotto
 Aly Reichenbach
 Matt Witzel

References

External links

MRF-FM
Hot adult contemporary radio stations in the United States